Lithophane petulca, the wanton pinion, is a species of cutworm or dart moth in the family Noctuidae. It is found in North America.

The MONA or Hodges number for Lithophane petulca is 9889.

References

Further reading

 
 
 

petulca